Lewis is the name of several places in the U.S. state of New York:
Lewis, Essex County, New York
Lewis, Lewis County, New York 
Lewis County, New York